Nicola Redomi (born 3 February 1988) is an Italian footballer who plays as a midfielder. Redomi almost spent his entire career at Tuscany region (except Valenzana and Gubbio). As of 2015 he is a Marina La Portuale player.

Career
A youth product of Internazionale, Redomi left the club in 2006–07 season after failed to promote to Primavera team from Berretti team. He was loaned to Pro Sesto (along with Marco Dalla Costa, Daniele Federici, Nicholas Artico, Alessandro Brioschi, Alessio Colombo, Alessandro Mosca and Luca Palazzo) and Castelnuovo Garfagnana In July 2008, he was signed by Valenzana in a co-ownership deal with Inter, for €500. In June 2009, Valenzana bought him outright. but he left for Figline.

in July 2010 he was signed by Gubbio but injured during a pre-season friendly. He then failed to earn a formal contract with the club. In October 2010 he joined Carrarese.

In September he joined Eccellenza Tuscany (Italian sixth level) team FC Lucca (the successor of bankrupted Lucchese).

References

External links
 FIGC 
 Football.it Profile 

Italian footballers
Inter Milan players
S.S.D. Pro Sesto players
Valenzana Mado players
Carrarese Calcio players
S.S.D. Lucchese 1905 players
Association football midfielders
People from Massa
1988 births
Living people
Sportspeople from the Province of Massa-Carrara
Footballers from Tuscany